Life Sucks is a graphic novel written by Jessica Abel and Gabe Soria, illustrated by Warren Pleece. It is about a vampire who works at night as a store clerk and is in love with a goth Latina woman who wants to be a vampire.

References

American graphic novels
Year of work missing